Gang Dong-u (born 10 February 1978) is a South Korean cyclist. He competed in the men's cross-country mountain biking event at the 2000 Summer Olympics.

References

1978 births
Living people
South Korean male cyclists
Olympic cyclists of South Korea
Cyclists at the 2000 Summer Olympics
Place of birth missing (living people)